The 2016–17 season is Ludogorets Razgrad's sixth season in the First League, of which they are defending Champions. They will also take part in the Bulgarian Cup, SuperCup and enter the UEFA Champions League at the second qualifying round stage.

Squad

Out on loan

Transfers

Summer

In:

Out:

Winter

In:

Out:

Competitions

Bulgarian Supercup

A Football Group

Regular stage

League table

Results summary

Results by round

Results

Championship stage

League table

Results summary

Results by round

Results

Bulgarian Cup

Final

UEFA Champions League

Qualifying phase

Group stage

UEFA Europa League

Knockout stage

Squad statistics

Appearances and goals

|-
|colspan="14"|Players away from the club on loan:

|-
|colspan="14"|Players who appeared for Ludogorets Razgrad that left during the season:

|}

Goal Scorers

Disciplinary record

Notes

References

Ludogorets Razgrad
PFC Ludogorets Razgrad seasons
Ludogorets Razgrad
Bulgarian football championship-winning seasons